Oxford Scientific Films (OSF) is a British company that produces natural history and documentary programmes. Founded on 8 July 1968, by documentary filmmaker Gerald Thompson, the independent film company broke new ground in the world of documentaries, using new filming techniques and capturing footage of never before filmed activities of its various subjects. In 1996, Oxford Scientific Films was sold to Circle Communications, where it retained its own identity as a division within the company. The following year, Circle Communications was taken over by Southern Star Entertainment UK. Under the new ownership, Oxford Scientific Films continued to enhance its reputation for innovative film-making, producing multiple award-winning series and films, including the Animal Planet series, Meerkat Manor.

In March 2008, Southern Star merged its Sydney-based factual business division into the Oxford Scientific Films division, retaining the brand name for specialist documentaries, while using "Southern Star Factual" as the brand name for its features and entertainment style documentaries.  When Southern Star was sold to Endemol, Oxford Scientific Films was retained by parent company Fairfax Media.  In 2011 Oxford Scientific Films was acquired by Boom Pictures Productions, who own a 70% share of the company.

History

Formation and growth
In 1967, cinemicrophotography pioneer, professional film maker, and Oxford University lecturer Gerald Thompson, was approached by the Ealing Corporation of Harvard about expanding its catalogue of short educational films. Universal Education and Visual Arts, a New York City, company also was interested in talking with Thompson about the works he'd produced. Thompson and five of his associates and former students: Peter Parks, who worked with plankton; John Paling, a fish specialist who worked with Parks; recent Oxford graduate Sean Morris; zoologist John Cooke; and Eric Skinner, who assisted Thompson with his films, wanted to form an independent film company. Thompson and Parks travelled to America to meet with the two companies to show their work. At the end of the meeting, they told the head of the company about their desire to open their own company and, impressed with the films he'd seen, he offered to finance them for the first three years and give them the funds to build a place to work.

When they returned to the United Kingdom, Thompson sold them a quarter acre of his garden, at a steeply discounted price, to be the home for the new building. They formed Oxford Scientific Films, taking part of the name from Parks' existing company Oxford Biological Films. Thompson, Parks, Morris, Paling, and Thompson's son David, headed the new company, which began operating on 8 July 1968. Thompson remained at his position at Oxford University while the company building was being completed, while the other four travelled to America to make the film loops for Ealing. Thompson resigned from the university on 2 September 1969, taking on the work at Oxford Scientific Films full-time.

The company focused initially on filming nature at a microscopic level, including insect and aquatic wildlife. Using specialised equipment and camera techniques the developed themselves, the company gained fame for its ability to record never before seen footage of the natural world. Its cinematographers became experts in micro, macro, snorkel, slow-motion and time-lapse photography. As the company grew, it expanded into other innovating filming and post-production techniques, and moved from creating short loops to creating television programmes and series, commercials, and feature films.

Southern Star acquisition
In September 1996, Oxford Scientific Films was purchased by film and television rights company Circle Communications for £3.9 million. £3.85 million of the purchase price was paid in cash, with the rest paid through a stock exchange. Less than a year later, in May 1997, Australia-based Southern Star Entertainment made a £8.3 million take over bid for Circle Communications, due to its distribution business, strong catalogue, and the company's drama and factual production business. Oxford Scientific Films, which had retained its own identity under Circle Communications, became a core division of Southern Star Entertainment.

On 4 December 2003, Oxford Scientific's extensive libraries of over 350,000 still images and over 2,000 of film footage libraries were acquired by Photolibrary. The acquisition was done as a share exchange, with Photolibrary acquiring shares in Oxford Scientific Films Limited, and Southern Star paying A$1 million to purchase a 46.46% equity in Photolibrary. Photolibrary retained existing employees of the library divisions, and continues using the names "Oxford Scientific" and "OSF" in promoting the libraries. Southern Star retained full control of Oxford Scientific Films production unit, and through that unit, continues supplying images and footage to the Photolibrary.

In March 2008, parent company Southern Star Group merged its Sydney-based "factual business unit" into the Oxford Scientific Films division. The merged company now uses two brands, with the existing Oxford Scientific Films name being used for its "specialist factual programmes", while the Southern Star Factual brand will be used for "features and factual entertainment shows."

Oxford Scientific Films today
Some time later, Oxford Scientific Films became part of the Twofour Group, which was acquired on 24 June 2015 by ITV Studios.

Notable works
Oxford Scientific Films has produced numerous award-winning programmes and films. In 1998, its film "The Forbidden Fruit" produced for the BBC's long-running series The Natural World and WNET Nature, won seven industry awards. Heroes of the High Frontier, produced as a National Geographic Special, won four awards and was a finalist for the Best of the Show Grand Award Trophy at the New York Festivals.

In 2005, the company launched Meerkat Manor, a docu-drama commissioned for Animal Planet. The series has since become Animal Planet's highest rated series, and has been nominated for two Primetime Emmy Awards, two Jackson Hole Wildlife Film Festival Awards and was a finalist at the 2006 Wildscreen Festival It won multiple awards at the 2006 Omni Awards and 2006 and 2007 New York Festivals Award Gala. The series is also noted for capturing never before seen aspects of the lives of meerkats, being the first to capture meerkat infanticide on film, and for expanding the boundaries of the documentary genre.

References

External links

Oxford Scientific Library (Photolibrary)

Mass media companies established in 1968
British documentary filmmakers
Film production companies of the United Kingdom
Television production companies of the United Kingdom
Documentary film production companies
Stock photography
1968 establishments in England